U.S. Route 20 (US 20) is a part of the U.S. Highway System that runs from Newport, Oregon, to Boston, Massachusetts. In the U.S. state of New York, US 20 extends  from the Pennsylvania state line at Ripley to the Massachusetts state line in the Berkshire Mountains. US 20 is the longest surface road in New York. It runs near the Lake Erie shore from Ripley to Buffalo and passes through the southern suburbs of Buffalo, the Finger Lakes, the glacial moraines of Central New York, and the city of Albany before crossing into Massachusetts. US 20 connects to all three major north–south Interstate Highways in Upstate New York: Interstate 390 (I-390) near Avon, I-81 south of Syracuse, and I-87 in Albany by way of Fuller Road Alternate.

With the exception of Albany, it passes directly through no major cities of the state, bypassing Syracuse and Utica by great distances to the south while the New York State Thruway and New York State Route 5 (NY 5), which share its corridor, pass right through or close to them.  It skirts the southern and eastern suburbs of Buffalo. It is, however, a major artery in many of the outlying areas it passes through in the hilly fringes of the Allegheny Plateau, often expanding to four lanes (it has no limited-access sections, although many intersecting roads are grade-separated) with extensive commercial strip development. One of these sections, the easterly of two concurrencies with NY 5 across the northern Finger Lakes, is the second-longest surface-road concurrency in New York state, behind only the concurrency of I-86 and NY 17 in the Southern Tier, extending  from Avon to Auburn.

From Oneida County to Albany, the road follows the historic Cherry Valley Turnpike, built at the beginning of the 19th century to connect Albany and, at the time, the important villages of Duanesburg, Cherry Valley, Richfield Springs, Cazenovia, and Skaneateles. US 20 itself was assigned in 1926 and was the state's main east–west route from that time until the Thruway was completed in the 1950s.

Route description
US 20 enters Western New York closely paralleling the Lake Erie shoreline, the Thruway and NY 5. Passing through the southeastern suburbs of Buffalo, it assumes a due-east heading at Depew, taking it to the NY 5 overlap in Avon. The two roads pass through many of the communities at the north ends of the larger Finger Lakes, splitting in Auburn. Through Central New York and the Central New York Region to its east, US 20 drifts south into the rugged upper reaches of the Allegheny Plateau, distancing itself from the Thruway and NY 5 by as much as 20 miles (32 km) at some points.

In the Capital District, the three routes all converge again, and US 20 goes right through downtown Albany, the largest city along its route in New York. Just before crossing the Hudson River, US 20 is joined again by US 9 for its second-longest concurrency, which ends just before the Thruway's Berkshire section in Schodack Center. From there it drifts southward into the Berkshires, crossing the Massachusetts state line west of Pittsfield.

All but  of US 20's  alignment in New York is maintained by the New York State Department of Transportation (NYSDOT). In Cayuga County, the  section of US 20 in Auburn between NY 38A and the eastern city line is maintained by the city of Auburn.

Western New York
From the state line to the Buffalo suburbs, US 20 is largely a two-lane through road on the same northeastern heading it has followed most of the way from Cleveland. It serves as the main street of the few communities it passes directly through. In the Buffalo area, US 20 begins to head more east, widening to four lanes and becoming a busy regional artery that intersects many other roads of major and minor importance. For the five miles (9 km) leading into Depew, it runs due north along with NY 78 as part of Transit Road, a busy commercial strip east of the city. At Depew, US 20 leaves Transit Road and begins its journey east across the state. The surrounding countryside returns to farmland by the Genesee County line.

Lake Erie

US 20 enters New York immediately after passing through State Line, Pennsylvania. It remains on the northeasterly course it has been following as I-90, now the New York State Thruway, veers between it and what is now NY 5 in order to remain on level ground. This section of US 20 hugs the foot of the beach ridge to the south of  Lake Erie, which is sometimes visible from sections of the highway  in Chautauqua County. A mile and a half east of the state line, Shortman Road (unsigned NY 950D) leaves to the left for exit 61, the westernmost interchange on the Thruway. Shortly afterward, US 20 reaches its first settlement in New York, the hamlet of Ripley, where it intersects NY 76, the first touring route along US 20 in the state.

Another eight miles (13 km) of two-lane rural road, crossed at its midpoint by the onetime New York Central Railroad and now CSX Transportation mainline, brings US 20 into its first incorporated community, the village of Westfield. Here, NY 394 intersects US 20 in the middle of town on its way to the Thruway's next exit and the hamlet of Barcelona, where it encounters NY 5 and the lake. Beyond Westfield, US 20 begins to drift south, coming further inland as it heads northeast.  to the east, it reaches Fredonia, the largest village along its route so far. 20 intersects with NY 60 at Reed Corners at the eastern edge of Fredonia, which heads north to the neighboring city of Dunkirk. Two miles (3 km) east, NY 39 becomes the first state route to end at US 20. It makes a loop of nearly  through the interior of the state to return to US 20 in the Finger Lakes.

US 20 Truck splits off from US 20 in the center of town, and rejoins its parent northeast of the village. This portion of the truck route is co-signed as NY 5, and the first of two overlaps between US 20 and NY 5 begins here. The road resumes its northeasterly course to an access road to the Thruway's exit 58 at Irving. After crossing Cattaraugus Creek into Erie County, the concurrency ends, with NY 5 staying close to the lake and US 20 closely paralleling the Thruway. NY 438 leaves this junction to the east, following the creek into the Cattaraugus Indian Reservation.

US 20, which is now Southwestern Boulevard, remains straight when paralleling the Thruway, intersecting only one other state highway, NY 249, just east of the village of Farnham, in an 18-mile (29 km) stretch that brings it to the outer fringes of the Buffalo area at Hamburg. Within  of the junction with NY 75, which provides access to the Thruway, US 20 intersects US 62, the first U.S. Highway that it encounters in New York. Continuing on, US 20 crosses the Thruway to reach Big Tree. This hamlet was once home to a six-way intersection featuring US 20A, but a late 2000s reconstruction project moved the west end of US 20A to a new junction to the northeast. Like NY 39, US 20A makes a long loop through Wyoming and Livingston counties to return to US 20 in the Finger Lakes.

Buffalo area
After the US 20A split, US 20 begins moving away from the lake and trends more to the east-northeast. The road becomes more developed, and  ahead a major Buffalo landmark looms to the south—Highmark Stadium, home of the Buffalo Bills. On home game days in the fall, traffic clogs the highway as it crosses over the US 219 expressway and curves northeast to reach the eastern terminus of NY 179 at Mile Strip Road. NY 179 offers access to US 219 via an interchange  to the west. A half-mile (1 km) beyond, the four-lane US 20 intersects the concurrent routes of NY 240 and NY 277, the main route to the village of Orchard Park off to the south.

At the West Seneca town line, US 20 turns due east when Reserve Road merges in from the west. After another mile, the road makes a 90-degree left turn at NY 187's northern terminus. It is now headed due north as Transit Road, a busy regional route that continues north as far as Lockport. After yet another mile, NY 16 and NY 78 come in from East Aurora to the southeast. NY 16 continues west to downtown Buffalo while NY 78 turns north to join US 20. Just north of the junction, Transit Road connects to the entrance ramps for an interchange with the NY 400 freeway, US 20's first interchange with a limited-access highway since meeting the Thruway in Irving.

Shops and stores line busy Transit Road on both sides as it divides the towns of West Seneca and Elma. A mile north of NY 400, US 20 and NY 78 reach another state highway, NY 354, near Ebenezer. Not far from that intersection, Cheektowaga and Lancaster replace West Seneca and Elma as the towns on either side of the road. Increasing development and traffic heralds Transit Road's entry into the village of Depew, and at NY 130, US 20 turns east, ending the overlap and taking the direction it will follow for most of the rest of its crossing of the state.

East of Buffalo
Taking the name Broadway, which NY 130 had retained from the city of Buffalo, US 20 goes through downtown Depew before it proceeds into the neighboring village of Lancaster. It returns to a rural two-lane road beyond Lancaster, passing through a traffic light only at the small village of Alden before crossing into Genesee County. In the town of Darien, US 20 continues straight past Darien Lakes State Park to the junction with NY 77 at Darien Center, where much summertime traffic turns north toward the nearby Darien Lake amusement park. NY 238 forks off to the southeast towards Attica at a junction  to the east of Darien Center.

Past the junction with NY 238, which forks off to the southeast towards Attica, the highway begins going straight up and down into the creek valleys here at the northern fringe of the Allegheny Plateau. Passing lanes are sometimes available on the downhill sections, particularly in the next community to the east, Alexander, where another route to Attica, NY 98 crosses via an overpass. This allows traffic to continue at a high speed through the surrounding dairy and sod farms up the other side and into Bethany, the next town, whose four four-way intersections offer only blinking yellow lights and no stop or yield traffic control devices to slow down drivers.

This unbroken stretch ends with a new light shortly into the next town, Pavilion, where NY 63 crosses at an angle. Here, traffic bound for the Southern Tier and further turn right to eventually connect to I-390 at Mount Morris. The four-lane US 20 straightaway continues across the town, with NY 19 also on an overpass at Pavilion Center. US 20 goes on past the Livingston County line  to the east, where it finally drops the Broadway name. After another , the route enters the hamlet of Fraser, where the north–south NY 36 crosses US 20 on its way from Mount Morris to Caledonia. US 20 continues on to the community of Canawaugus  to the east, where NY 5 enters from the village of Caledonia to the northwest and rejoins US 20. The two routes continue east from here to the village of Avon.

NY 5 concurrency and Finger Lakes
The  concurrency that begins here is the longest in the state, and it carries the two routes across the northern Finger Lakes region, a section of the plateau where glaciers carved deep valleys only to fill them with their meltwater. The land around the road is gently hilly, often wide open and heavily farmed, on the outermost fringes of the Rochester area. NY 39 is the first highway that intersects the concurrency, ending its loop just west of the traffic circle at Avon's center. In the village of Lima  ahead, NY 5 and US 20 meet NY 15A, the eastern alternate route of NY 15. Just east of the village, the road crosses Honeoye Creek and enters Ontario County.

Across the county line, US 20 and NY 5 pass through the town and hamlet of West Bloomfield, where NY 65 comes to an end from the left. Next, in neighboring East Bloomfield, NY 444 leaves to the north for Victor and NY 64 joins the concurrency. NY 64 leaves  later at the eastern end of US 20A in South Bloomfield. The highway continues through the open, rolling lake country to a junction with West Avenue west of the city of Canandaigua. At this point, NY 5 and US 20 turn southward to follow a bypass around the western and southern edge of the city. At Bristol Road, the first highway that the bypass crosses, NY 21 joins US 20 and NY 5 and follows both routes to Canandaigua, where a hill west of downtown offers a view to Canandaigua Lake, the first of the lakes it passes in this region.

In downtown Canandaigua, NY 21 leaves to join NY 332, a prime route from Canandaigua and the lake region to the eastern suburbs of Rochester via I-490. Past NY 332, the highway runs past the lowlands abutting the lakes to a junction with NY 364, which heads south down the east side of the lake. Now named Eastern Boulevard, the routes continue past Finger Lakes Community College to the next southbound highway, NY 247. Roughly  of open road climb the gentle rise dividing Canandaigua Lake and Seneca Lake, the latter of which is the largest of the Finger Lakes. This ascent is subsequently met by a descent as the highway heads toward Geneva.

Just outside the city in the Lenox Park neighborhood of the town of Geneva, another pair of routes, NY 14A and NY 245, come to their northern end. After entering the city and passing the campus of Hobart and William Smith Colleges, NY 5 and US 20 cross under NY 14A's parent route, NY 14, just before the lake shore. US 20 and NY 5 continue along the water as a four-lane road with a median and cross into Seneca County at the lake's outlet. As at Canandaigua, a southbound route, NY 96A, leaves just past the lake. NY 5 and US 20 continue on, following the northern edge of the Cayuga–Seneca Canal toward the village of Waterloo.

Just outside the village, NY 414, a major north–south highway, creates another three-route concurrency when it joins from the north. It lasts for just  to the center of Seneca Falls, home to Women's Rights National Historical Park and the National Women's Hall of Fame. Here, NY 414 departs to the south to follow the lake down to Watkins Glen while NY 5 and US 20 turn to the northeast at Van Cleef Lake.

This heading lasts for  until NY 318 ends to the west right before a four-way intersection at NY 89. From here, the road runs straight in a slightly more easterly direction south of Montezuma National Wildlife Refuge, where the Thruway is briefly visible to the north, before entering Cayuga County as it crosses over the Cayuga–Seneca Canal. In Cayuga County, the highway briefly returns to the east before a junction with NY 90. The highway subsequently turns southeast and back east over the next  as it approaches Auburn. NY 326 departs to the south at the western city limits. Roughly  into the city, the roadway briefly splits as NY 34 and NY 38 briefly join. At NY 38A, the overlap between NY 5 and US 20 comes to an end as the two routes go their separate ways.

Central New York
While NY 5 heads north from the split towards Syracuse and the Thruway, US 20 keeps to its easterly heading, following East Genesee Street out of the city, proceeding past Auburn Correctional Facility to the Onondaga County line. Here, NY 41A comes in from the south at the western end of the village of Skaneateles, a community at the north end of the eponymous lake, the last Finger Lake along US 20. NY 321 leaves to the north in the center of town, and NY 41A's parent route, NY 41, begins its long journey to the Southern Tier on the other side of Skaneateles. US 20 continues east for another  out of the village to the south end of NY 175, after which it starts trending southward, returning to two lanes.

The landscape starts to grow hillier as it begins to cross the glacial moraines of the less populated reaches of southern Onondaga County. The southward trend continues for another  to an intersection with NY 80, a signed east–west route running north–south at this point.

From LaFayette, it drops into another deep valley, curving around an area known as Big Bend, prior to climbing back up  towards the crest of the ridge at Pompey. After another , the road drops down into the Limestone Creek valley and crosses into Madison County as it curves back up into higher ground. Another  brings US 20 to the eastern terminus of NY 92, the south end of Cazenovia Lake and the village of Cazenovia itself. Its main street is marked by a brief concurrency with NY 13, a long, curving north–south route that comes from the cities of Ithaca and Cortland to the south.

East of Cazenovia, US 20 resumes its southward drift as it climbs into the high ground again and expands to four lanes, passing the small village of Morrisville in the process. It descends from there to its next state highway, NY 46, where it reverts to two lanes for a brief concurrency, after which NY 46 leaves for isolated Hamilton. The southern trend reverses itself after this junction, with first NY 26 and later NY 12B joining US 20 to create another three-route overlap. This persists for three very straight miles until both leave to the north in the town of Madison. After another , the highway crosses into Oneida County.

From this intersection, US 20 takes the name Cherry Valley Turnpike from the historic road it follows towards Albany. US 20 climbs back into the high ground afterward and veers further southward to the next intersection with a major north–south highway, NY 8, at Bridgewater. Like NY 12, it leads northward to the city of Utica. After NY 8, the road crosses the headwaters of the Unadilla River into Otsego County.

Leatherstocking Region
US 20 enters Otsego County only for a mile, where it intersects County Route 18 which is the northern terminus of former NY 413, then enters Herkimer County next to the point where Herkimer, Otsego, and Oneida county lines converge. US 20 continues for about  before entering back into Herkimer County, which brings it into the Leatherstocking Region, where James Fenimore Cooper set his Leatherstocking Tales. This section of the highway keeps trending south as it skirts the northern edge of the Catskill Plateau, offering scenic valley vistas to the south. To the north the land levels to the Mohawk Valley. Through much of this stretch the road expands to four lanes as the region's main east–west artery.

As it enters the county, it enters West Winfield and begins to overlap NY 51 which comes in from the south. Trending southeast in the town of Richfield,  pass before NY 28 briefly overlaps US 20 just west of Richfield Springs, a popular local shopping destination, on its long curve across the state from the Catskills to the Adirondacks. NY 167 begins a few blocks further east, and US 20 returns to Herkimer County  beyond that, intersecting only county roads over the next several miles.

A mile after returning to Otsego County, NY 80 again intersects on its way from Cooperstown and Otsego Lake to the south to Fort Plain to the north. The next  of US 20 swing around the north end of the east ridge of Cherry Valley into the town of that name, where NY 166 leaves at a partial interchange to follow the valley south to Milford. After another swing around the valley's other ridge, US 20 crosses into Schoharie County. About  from the county line, the highway intersects another long north–south route, NY 10, south of Sharon Springs. US 20 proceeds for another  to Sharon, where NY 145 provides a route to Cobleskill to the south. The route continues east to Esperance, where it crosses Schoharie Creek to enter Schenectady County.

Capital District
The crossing of the Schoharie Creek brings US 20 into the first of three counties that make up the greater Albany area. Here, development along the road increases and the road itself is often four lanes. The region is divided by the Hudson River, where US 20 begins its second-longest concurrency with US 9, the state's longest north–south US route.

West of Hudson and Albany
Just past the county line, another Catskills-to-Canada highway, NY 30, intersects with US 20. About  beyond that is the northern terminus of short NY 395, which runs south to the ever-closer NY 7. US 20 veers closer to NY 7 before finally intersecting the highway  from NY 395. Not far to the east is an interchange with I-88, NY 7's paralleling freeway between Binghamton and Schenectady. Access to I-88 is via a shared access road from both routes due to the oblique angle of the intersection. From here the highway, now known as Western Turnpike, continues to trend to the south for another  to the southern terminus of NY 406 at the hamlet of Gifford. Shortly afterwards, US 20 enters Albany County as the Helderberg Escarpment looms to the south.

It stays straight to its first major intersection, the northern terminus of NY 397 a mile later, which is followed  later by a junction with NY 158 just east of Watervliet Reservoir. After another , CSX's main line crosses over the highway again. Development begins to pick up where NY 146 comes in from the north for a short overlap that ends at Hartmans Corners and Tawasentha Park. The road reaches the Albany suburbs two miles (3 km) to the east, where NY 155 intersects US 20 in Westmere. Just beyond the community is Crossgates Mall, a major Albany-area destination. Immediately east of the mall is US 20's first crossing of the Thruway, now I-87, since the southern Buffalo suburbs, and the southern end of Fuller Road Alternate, an extension of the Adirondack Northway, in an area known as McKownville.

A half-mile later, the busy four-lane route passes the south side of the State University of New York at Albany's highly modernistic campus. It continues into the city of Albany itself as Western Avenue. Commercial developments line both sides of US 20 to the interchange with NY 85, a truncated freeway that connects to US 20 via the adjacent Dayton and Ormond streets. The neighborhoods around the road become primarily residential at this point. Roughly  from NY 85, US 20 forks right onto Madison Avenue and passes The College of Saint Rose.

After Washington Park on the north side, downtown Albany draws nearer, with Erastus Corning Tower, the tallest building in the state outside of New York City, rising ahead. US 9W crosses Madison from Delaware Avenue to Lark Street, with its concurrent NY 443 terminating on the southern side of the intersection where Delaware ends at Madison. Shortly afterward, US 20 runs along the south side of Empire State Plaza, the modern complex that houses the offices of state legislators and many executive branch agencies. A few blocks further is South Pearl Street, also NY 32, a long route from the lower Hudson Valley to Glens Falls. US 20 follows two blocks of South Pearl Street and NY 32 to reach an interchange with the South Mall Arterial. US 20 leaves NY 32 here, following an eastern extension of the arterial to the complex interchange connecting I-787 with US 9 and US 20. US 9 joins US 20 amidst the junction, and both routes crosses the Hudson via the Dunn Memorial Bridge, the southernmost free crossing of the Hudson.

East of Hudson: US 9 and the Berkshires
At the east end of the bridge, US 9 and US 20, now in the city and county of Rensselaer, follow the offramps past the stubs built for the canceled South Mall Expressway and assume a southeastern course along a busy four-lane strip containing a center turn lane. Near the city limit, NY 9J leaves to the south to follow the river's east bank down to Stockport. The road subsequently goes up a hill with a panoramic view of the Albany skyline behind it and proceeds into the town of East Greenbush, where NY 151 heads off to the northeast. After  with heavy commercial development on either side of the road, US 4 begins and leaves to the north at a busy intersection. The center of town follows, after which the concurrency enters Schodack.

In Schodack, development along the road begins to ease as the center turn lane gives way to a double yellow line. While US 9 heads south for Poughkeepsie and the city of New York, US 20 reverts to two lanes and maintains its southeastern course for another  before turns more to the east for another two miles. In Nassau, it connects to the north end of NY 203. East of the village, the terrain becomes hillier, indicating that US 20 has reached the edge of The Berkshires.

About  outside of the village of Nassau, NY 66 joins the road. This overlap ends just before the Columbia County line, with NY 66 following a southerly course towards Chatham. US 20, meanwhile follows Kinderhook Creek and Wyomanock Creek, through narrow, wooded valleys to New Lebanon, passing the Mount Lebanon Shaker Society, a National Historic Landmark as the second-oldest Shaker settlement in the country. In the center of this small town, US 20 meets NY 22, the longest north–south route in the state, and the two form a  overlap, US 20's last concurrency in New York. After the split, US 20 makes a wide turn and heads almost south up a mountainside, climbing into Massachusetts near Pittsfield State Forest a mile later.

History

Origins
The road from Albany heading west was first constructed as a toll road or turnpike at the end of the 18th century. The First Great Western Turnpike Corporation was chartered in 1799 to build a road from Albany, the capital of New York, to the Revolutionary War frontier town of Cherry Valley. In 1803, a second corporation, the Third Great Western Turnpike, was chartered to further extend the road to Cazenovia. The Third Great Western Turnpike was completed as planned by 1811 and was heavily used by people trying to establish new settlements in central New York. The two turnpikes, collectively known as the Cherry Valley Turnpike, became a stagecoach route in 1816. The Cherry Valley Turnpike name was also later applied to an untolled extension of the road west to Skaneateles.

The establishment of the Erie Canal and the Utica and Schenectady Railroad slowly ate away at the revenues of the Cherry Valley Turnpike. The turnpike stopped being a toll road in 1857. A similar turnpike east of the Hudson River, connecting Rensselaer to the Massachusetts state line was also established in 1799 as the Rensselaer and Columbia Turnpike. This turnpike remained in operation as late as 1896, but it eventually folded around the turn of the 20th century. The state took over the maintenance of highways at the beginning of the 20th century and began paving many roads across the state. In 1908, the legislature created a statewide system of unsigned legislative routes that used these new state highways and other, yet-to-be improved roads.

Early designations
Several parts of the former Cherry Valley and Rensselaer and Columbia Turnpikes were included in the new route system. East of the Hudson River, the Rensselaer and Columbia Turnpike became part of Route 1 from Schodack Center to Rensselaer and part of Route 21 from Nassau east to the Massachusetts state line. West of Albany, the Cherry Valley Turnpike was designated as part of Route 9 from Cazenovia to Bouckville and as part of Route 8 from there to a point south of Oriskany Falls. Another section, from Bridgewater to East Winfield, was included in Route 23. In 1912, the segment of the turnpike between Sharon and Sharon Springs became part of the new Route 38-a.

Farther west, Route 6 and Route 18 were assigned in 1908 to two major east–west roads connecting Buffalo to Albany and the Pennsylvania state line, respectively. West of modern-day Utica, Route 6 followed the old Genesee Road, a highway that passed through Auburn, Geneva, Avon, and Batavia on its way to Buffalo. The easternmost leg of Route 6 in Guilderland and Albany used a portion of the Cherry Valley Turnpike. Route 18, meanwhile, utilized a series of highways that ran either along or slightly inland from Lake Erie. All of Route 18 and most of Route 6—including all of the route west of Auburn—later became part of the Yellowstone Trail, an early cross-country auto trail established in 1912. East of Albany, the trail utilized the old Rensselaer and Columbia Turnpike.

On March 1, 1921, the legislature redefined the legislative route system, altering or removing several routes and adding others. Routes 6 and 18 were left virtually unchanged, as was the portion of Route 1 north of Schodack Center. Route 21, however, was altered to follow modern NY 66 between Averill Park and East Nassau. In the Central New York Region, Route 38-a was redesignated as Route 39 and extended west along the Cherry Valley Turnpike to meet Route 8 near Oriskany Falls. From Bridgewater to Oriskany Falls, Route 39 overlapped with Route 23. The legislative route system remained New York's primary route numbering system until the mid-1920s.

Assignment
Highways were first publicly numbered in New York in 1924. One of the handful of routes assigned at this time was NY 5, a cross-state route that extended from the Pennsylvania line in the west to the Massachusetts line in the east. From Auburn west, it initially utilized all of legislative Route 18 and the portion of Route 6 east of Avon. In between Buffalo and Avon, NY 5 used a linear, previously unnumbered east–west road to the south that bypassed the communities along Route 6. Continuing east from Auburn, NY 5 followed the Cherry Valley Turnpike (partially Routes 6, 8, 9, 23, and 39) to Albany and the Rensselaer and Columbia Turnpike (partially Routes 1 and 21) to Massachusetts.

One or two years later, however, the portion of NY 5 from Buffalo to Albany was shifted north to its modern alignment—mostly old legislative Route 6—and the former, more southerly route was designated as New York State Route 7. Around the same time, a parallel route to the south, from Buffalo through East Aurora and Geneseo to near Avon, was designated as NY 35. NY 7 and NY 35 were both short-lived designations as US 20 was assigned on November 11, 1926, as part of the establishment of the U.S. Highway System. When the U.S. Highway was first posted in New York in 1927, it was assigned to then-NY 5 from the Pennsylvania line to near Hamburg, a previously unnumbered but state-maintained highway between Hamburg and East Aurora, NY 35 from East Aurora to Geneseo, NY 7 between Skaneateles and Albany, and NY 5 from Albany to the Massachusetts line. US 20 overlapped with NY 5 between Avon and Skaneateles. The old NY 7 from Buffalo to Avon was renumbered to NY 35.

Realignments
In the 1930 renumbering of state highways in New York, an alternate route of US 20 between Irving and Hamburg became NY 20B. While US 20 ran along the shore of Lake Erie between the two locations, NY 20B followed a more inland alignment that took it east of Angola. US 20 was realigned  to follow NY 20B between the two locations. The former lakeside routing of US 20 became part of an extended NY 5. Around the same time, the portion of Southwestern Boulevard between US 20 and NY 78 (now NY 187) in the towns of Hamburg and Orchard Park was designated as part of NY 18C. This segment of NY 18C was renumbered to NY 278 . Farther east, US 20 was realigned  to pass through Lakeville on its way from Geneseo to East Avon.

The most substantial realignment in US 20's New York history occurred  when it was shifted north onto its current alignment between Hamburg and East Avon, replacing NY 278 and NY 35. Most of the previous route via East Aurora and Geneseo initially became NY 20A; however, that route was partially redesignated as US 20A by the following year. In the mid-1950s, a new four-lane roadway, Eastern Boulevard, was built north of Lake Shore Drive between South Main Street in Canandaigua and the modern-day intersection of Lake Shore and Eastern Boulevard in Hopewell. US 20 and NY 5 were moved from Lake Shore Drive to the new highway upon completion. The remainder of the bypass around the southwestern extents of the city was built in the late 1970s and early 1980s.

In Canandaigua, the former routing of US 20 on South Main Street remains state maintained as NY 942T; until 1996, the portion of West Avenue between the west end of the bypass and the Canandaigua city line (also old US 20) was also maintained by NYSDOT as NY 942W. Even though maintenance of the road was transferred to the town of Canandaigua on September 1, 1996, the designation remained in NYSDOT documents until 2007. In Hamburg, the section of old US 20 between Athol Springs and Big Tree that did not become part of NY 5  is now County Route 576 (CR 576) from NY 5 to Bayview Road and NY 951E, an unsigned reference route, from US 62 to US 20A.

In Geneva, US 20 was initially routed on East North Street and Border City Road, overlapping with NY 14 through the city and rejoining its modern routing in East Geneva. The overlap was eliminated  when US 20 was moved onto a new roadway located along the edge of Seneca Lake. US 20 was realigned again in the 1960s to use a new divided highway built midway between the lake shore road and Border City Road. Border City Road is now maintained by Seneca County as CR 110.

Construction and legacy

While most of US 20 was constructed in the early 20th century as part of the legislative route system, many sections of the highway were left unimproved or unbuilt until well into the 1930s. Two substantial sections of the route—from Alexander (NY 98) to Avon and from Auburn to Cazenovia—were unimproved or unbuilt as late as 1926. The portion from Auburn to Skaneateles was brought up to state highway standards  while the section connecting LaFayette (US 11) to Pompey (NY 91) was built by the following year. The last section of the Skaneateles–Cazenovia segment to open was the piece between Pompey and Cazenovia, which opened to traffic in mid-September 1934. Meanwhile, the highway was brought up to standards from Alexander to Bethany , from Bethany to Pavilion (NY 19) , between Pavilion and NY 36 , and from NY 36 to Avon .

The now-complete US 20 was the major thoroughfare across New York for several decades. During the early days, there were no motels around and only major cities—such as Auburn and Albany—had hotels. Around the late 1940s, automobiles became much more reliable and US 20 grew into a strong touring road. The road was one of the most traveled up until the New York State Thruway was created in the 1950s. Much of traffic and progress along US 20 were halted as a result. The  US 20 is lined with historical places, including Sharon Springs, Cherry Valley, Bouckville, Cazenovia, Skaneateles, Auburn, Geneva and East Aurora. The length of US 20 from LaFayette to Duanesburg was designated as a  New York State Scenic Byway on August 10, 2005.

Suffixed routes
US 20 has had seven suffixed routes in New York; one U.S. Route (US 20A) and six New York state routes. All six state routes have been removed or redesignated; US 20A, however, still exists.
 US 20A is an alternate route of US 20 between Hamburg, Erie County, and East Bloomfield, Ontario County. It was assigned .
 The NY 20A designation has been used for two distinct highways:
 The first NY 20A was an alternate route of US 20 between the Pennsylvania state line at Ripley and Silver Creek in Chautauqua County. It was assigned as part of the 1930 renumbering of state highways in New York and supplanted by NY 5 .
 The second NY 20A was a short-lived alternate route of US 20 between Hamburg and Avon. It was assigned  and largely replaced by US 20A by the following year.
 NY 20B was an alternate route of US 20 between Irving and Orchard Park in Erie County. It was assigned as part of the 1930 renumbering and supplanted by a realigned US 20 .
 NY 20C was a loop route connecting US 20 to the then-village of Holcomb (now part of Bloomfield) in Ontario County. The route was assigned  and partially replaced by NY 444 in 1997.
 NY 20D was a connector between then-US 20 in Geneseo and NY 5 in Avon. It was assigned  and supplanted by NY 20A . The route is now the northeasternmost portion of NY 39.
 NY 20N was an alternate route of US 20 between Marcellus, Onondaga County, and Cazenovia, Madison County. The route overlapped other, pre-existing routes for its entire length. It was assigned  and removed , leaving just the routes it overlapped.
 NY 20SY was an alternate route of US 20 between Skaneateles and Cazenovia in Onondaga and Madison counties. Like NY 20N, NY 20SY was concurrent with other, pre-existing routes for most of its length. It was assigned in the early 1950s and removed , leaving just the routes it overlapped.

US 20 Truck

U.S. Route 20 Truck is a short truck route of US 20 in Silver Creek. The two become concurrent for another mile on Howard Street where US 20 Truck ends at an intersection with US 20.

In the village of Silver Creek, commercial truck traffic is not allowed to use US 20 east unless said traffic is making deliveries to local businesses in either the village or the South Dayton, Perrysburg, and Cherry Creek areas southeast of Silver Creek. All other commercial truck traffic per New York state vehicle and traffic laws must use US 20 Truck through the village.

Major intersections

See also

List of county routes in Seneca County, New York

References

External links

20
 New York
Transportation in Chautauqua County, New York
Transportation in Erie County, New York
Transportation in Genesee County, New York
Transportation in Livingston County, New York
Transportation in Ontario County, New York
Transportation in Seneca County, New York
Transportation in Cayuga County, New York
Transportation in Onondaga County, New York
Transportation in Madison County, New York
Transportation in Oneida County, New York
Transportation in Herkimer County, New York
Transportation in Otsego County, New York
Transportation in Schoharie County, New York
Transportation in Schenectady County, New York
Transportation in Albany County, New York
Transportation in Albany, New York
Transportation in Rensselaer County, New York
Transportation in Columbia County, New York